The General Post Office was the British postal system from 1660 until 1969.

The General Post Office may also refer to:

Australia 
 Former General Post Office, Adelaide
 General Post Office, Brisbane
 General Post Office, Hobart
 General Post Office, Launceston
 General Post Office, Melbourne 
 General Post Office, Perth
 General Post Office, Sydney

China 
 General Post Office Building, Shanghai

Croatia 
 General Post Office, Zagreb

Hong Kong 
General Post Office, Hong Kong

India 

 General Post Office, Old Delhi
 General Post Office, New Delhi
 General Post Office, Chennai
 General Post Office, Kolkata
 General Post Office, Mumbai
 General Post Office, Patna

Ireland 
 General Post Office, Dublin

Macau 
Macau General Post Office

Malaysia 
 Kuala Lumpur General Post Office

Malta 
 The General Post Office in Valletta was housed in various buildings during the 19th and 20th centuries:
 Banca Giuratale (1842–1886)
 Palazzo Parisio (1886–1973)
 Auberge d'Italie (1973–1997)

Myanmar 
 General Post Office, Yangon

Pakistan 
 General Post Office, Lahore

Serbia 
 General Post Office, Belgrade

Singapore 
 The Fullerton Hotel Singapore, formerly the General Post Office Building

Sri Lanka 
 Former General Post Office, Colombo
 Kandy General Post Office

Thailand 
 General Post Office (Bangkok)

United Kingdom 
 General Post Office, Edinburgh
 General Post Office, London

United States 
 General Post Office (Washington, D.C.)
 James A. Farley Building, New York, formerly the General Post Office Building

See also 
 Central Post Office (disambiguation)